Georgs Andrejevs (30 October 1932 – 16 July 2022) was a Latvian politician and Member of the European Parliament for the Latvian Way party; part of the European Liberal Democrat and Reform Party. He was the Foreign Minister of Latvia from 1992 to 1994.

Andrejevs died on 16 July 2022 in Riga, Latvia at the age of 89.

References

1932 births
2022 deaths
People from Tukums
Popular Front of Latvia politicians
Latvian Way politicians
Latvia's First Party/Latvian Way politicians
Ministers of Foreign Affairs of Latvia
Latvian diplomats
Deputies of the Supreme Council of the Republic of Latvia
Deputies of the 5th Saeima
Latvian Way MEPs
Latvia's First Party/Latvian Way MEPs
MEPs for Latvia 2004–2009
Riga Stradiņš University alumni